Sycamore Township is one of nineteen townships in DeKalb County, Illinois, USA. As of the 2010 census, its population was 14,425 and it contained 5,855 housing units.

Geography

Cities, towns, villages
 Sycamore (northeast three-quarters)

Unincorporated towns
 Charter Grove at

Cemeteries
 Barron
 Charter Grove
 Elmwood
 Mount Carmel Sycamore

Airports and landing strips
 Colonial Acres Airport
 Willadae Farms Airport
 Willis Airport

Demographics

School districts
 Genoa-Kingston Community Unit School District 424
 Sycamore Community Unit School District 427

Political districts
 Illinois's 14th congressional district
 State House District 70
 State Senate District 35

References
 
 United States Census Bureau 2009 TIGER/Line Shapefiles
 United States National Atlas

External links
 City-Data.com
 Illinois State Archives
 Township Officials of Illinois
 DeKalb County Official Site

Townships in DeKalb County, Illinois
1849 establishments in Illinois
Townships in Illinois